Jaani is a village in Saaremaa Parish, Saare County in western Estonia.

Before the administrative reform in 2017, the village was in Orissaare Parish. 1026 people live in Jaani.

References 

Villages in Saare County